Deep in My Heart is a 1954 American MGM biographical musical film about the life of operetta composer Sigmund Romberg, who wrote the music for The Student Prince, The Desert Song, and The New Moon, among others.  Leonard Spigelgass adapted the film from Elliott Arnold's 1949 biography of the same name.  Roger Edens produced, Stanley Donen directed and Eugene Loring choreographed. José Ferrer played Romberg, with support from soprano Helen Traubel as a fictional character and Merle Oberon as actress, playwright, librettist, producer, and director  Dorothy Donnelly.

The film, which takes its title from "Deep in My Heart, Dear," a song from "The Student Prince," primarily consists of a series of cameo turns by nearly every significant singer or dancer on the MGM lot at the time. These include dancer Cyd Charisse (dubbed by Carol Richards), Rosemary Clooney (Ferrer's wife), Vic Damone, Howard Keel, Gene Kelly and his brother Fred Kelly (their only on-screen appearance together), Tony Martin, Ann Miller, James Mitchell,  Jane Powell, Joan Weldon, and the ballerina Tamara Toumanova (dubbed by Betty Wand).  Robert Easton, Russ Tamblyn, Susan Luckey, and Ludwig Stössel make uncredited appearances.

Deep in My Heart was the final film in a series of four MGM biopics based on the lives of composers, which included Till the Clouds Roll By (Jerome Kern, 1946), Words and Music (Rodgers and Hart, 1948), and Three Little Words (Kalmar and Ruby, 1950).

Cast
 José Ferrer as Sigmund Romberg
 Merle Oberon as Dorothy Donnelly
 Helen Traubel as Anna Mueller
 Doe Avedon as Lillian Romberg
 Walter Pidgeon as J. J. Shubert
 Paul Henreid as Florenz Ziegfeld, Jr.
 Tamara Toumanova as Gaby Deslys
 Betty Wand as Gaby Deslys (singing voice)
 Paul Stewart as Bert Townsend
 Isobel Elsom as Mrs. Harris
 David Burns as Lazar Berrison, Sr.
 Jim Backus as Ben Judson

Musical numbers 
 "Overture" — Orchestral and choral medley:
 "One Kiss" (from 1928 operetta The New Moon, lyrics by Oscar Hammerstein II)
 "Desert Song" (from 1926 operetta The Desert Song, lyrics by Oscar Hammerstein II and Otto A. Harbach)
 "Deep in My Heart, Dear" (from 1924 operetta The Student Prince, lyrics by Dorothy Donnelly)
 "You Will Remember Vienna" (from 1930 film Viennese Nights, lyrics by Oscar Hammerstein II)
 "You Will Remember Vienna" — Helen Traubel (from 1930 film Viennese Nights, lyrics by Oscar Hammerstein II)
 "Leg of Mutton" — José Ferrer and Helen Traubel (turkey trot with lyrics added by Roger Edens)
 "Softly, as in a Morning Sunrise" — Betty Wand (dubbing for Tamara Toumanova) (from 1928 operetta The New Moon, lyrics by Oscar Hammerstein II)
 "Softly, as in a Morning Sunrise" — Helen Traubel (from 1928 operetta The New Moon, lyrics by Oscar Hammerstein II)
 "Mr. & Mrs." — Rosemary Clooney and José Ferrer (from 1922 musical The Blushing Bride, lyrics by Cyrus D. Wood)
 "I Love to Go Swimmin' with Wimmen" — Gene Kelly and his brother, Fred Kelly (from 1921 musical Love Birds, lyrics by Ballard MacDonald)
 "Road to Paradise"/"Will You Remember (Sweetheart)" — Vic Damone and Jane Powell (from 1917 musical Maytime, lyrics by Rida Johnson Young)
 "Girls Goodbye" — José Ferrer (lyrics by Dorothy Donnelly)
 "Fat Fat Fatima" — José Ferrer (from 1921 musical Love Birds, lyrics by Ballard MacDonald)
 "Jazza-Dada-Doo" — José Ferrer (from 1921 musical Bombo, lyrics by Harold R. Atteridge)
 "It" — Ann Miller (from 1926 operetta The Desert Song, lyrics by Oscar Hammerstein II and Otto A. Harbach)
 "Serenade" — William Olvis (from 1924 operetta The Student Prince, lyrics by Dorothy Donnelly)
 "One Alone" — Carol Richards (dubbing for Cyd Charisse) and James Mitchell (from 1926 operetta The Desert Song, lyrics by Oscar Hammerstein II and Otta A. Harbach)
 "Your Land and My Land" — Howard Keel (from 1927 musical My Maryland, lyrics by Dorothy Donnelly)
 "Auf Wiedersehn" — Helen Traubel (from 1915 musical The Blue Paradise, lyrics by Herbert Reynolds)
 "Lover, Come Back to Me" — Tony Martin with Joan Weldon (from 1928 operetta The New Moon, lyrics by Oscar Hammerstein II)
 "Stout-Hearted Men" — Helen Traubel (from 1928 operetta The New Moon, lyrics by Oscar Hammerstein II)
 "When I Grow Too Old to Dream" — José Ferrer (from 1935 film The Night Is Young, lyrics by Oscar Hammerstein II)

Box office
According to MGM records the film earned $2,471,000 in the US and Canada and $1,507,000 elsewhere, resulting in a profit of $1,474,000.

Reception and distribution
The film was not a critical success.  According to the reviewer for the New York Times, Deep in My Heart "calls for a strong digestive system and a considerable tolerance for clichés."

The film has been released in VHS and laserdisc formats, on DVD  and Blu-Ray.  The soundtrack, previously released on LP, was made available on iTunes in 2006.  The film has been shown on Turner Classic Movies.

References

Further reading
 Silverman, Stephen M. Dancing on the Ceiling: Stanley Donen and his Movies. New York: Knopf, 1996.  .
 Tibbets, John C.  Composers in the Movies: Studies in Musical Biography.  New Haven: Yale University Press, 2005.  115–22.  .

External links

 
 
 
 
 
 Cyd Charisse and James Mitchell in Deep in My Heart

1954 films
1954 musical films
1950s biographical films
American biographical films
American musical films
1950s English-language films
Films about composers
Films about musical theatre
Films based on biographies
Films directed by Stanley Donen
Jukebox musical films
Metro-Goldwyn-Mayer films
Films set in the 1920s
1950s American films